Christian Karlsson may refer to:

 Christian Karlsson (DJ) (born 1975), member of Bloodshy & Avant
 Christian Karlsson (footballer) (born 1969), Swedish former footballer